Sorkhanabad (also Romanized as Sorkhanābād; also known as Sorkhūnābād and Sorkhān Āb) is a village in Qaravolan Rural District, Loveh District, Galikash County, Golestan Province, Iran. At the 2006 census, its population was 202, in 54 families.

References 

Populated places in Galikash County